Starrcade '85: The Gathering was the third annual Starrcade professional wrestling closed-circuit television event produced by Jim Crockett Promotions under the National Wrestling Alliance (NWA) banner. It took place on November 28, 1985, from the Greensboro Coliseum Complex in Greensboro, North Carolina and Omni Coliseum in Atlanta, Georgia, with the event going back and forth from both arenas.

The main event was between Ric Flair and Dusty Rhodes for the NWA World Heavyweight Championship. Their feud escalated when Flair broke Rhodes' ankle in September. After the event, Flair formed the Four Horsemen stable, and continued to feud with Rhodes. Other matches included Magnum T. A. and Tully Blanchard in an "I Quit" steel cage match for the NWA United States Heavyweight Championship, and The Rock 'n' Roll Express and the team of Ivan and Nikita Koloff in a Steel Cage Match for the NWA World Tag Team Championship.

In 2014, the WWE Network included the previous Starrcades (1983–1986), which had been transmitted via closed-circuit television, alongside the rest of the Starrcades in the pay-per-view section.

Background

The main feud heading into Starrcade was between Ric Flair and Dusty Rhodes over the NWA World Heavyweight Championship. Flair was in his third reign as the champion, and his reign at the time had lasted for over a year. On September 29 at the Omni in Atlanta, after Flair defeated Nikita Koloff in a steel cage match, Nikita and Ivan Koloff attacked Flair until Rhodes came and fought them off. Ole and Arn Anderson then came, and, along with Flair, beat down Rhodes. Flair broke Rhodes' left ankle with a diving knee drop, and applied the figure four leglock.

Previous Starrcade events have been held at the Greensboro Coliseum, and this event was the first to be expanded, and held in two locations, with both also serving as locations for broadcasting via closed-circuit television. It was the first time an event was broadcast live from two locations. In 1985, the World Wrestling Federation was an emerging competitor to Jim Crockett Promotions, and created the WrestleMania event, which had significant success. The following year's WrestleMania, WrestleMania 2, was created similar to Starrcade, being held in three locations.

Event

The first match of the event was between Krusher Khruschev and Sam Houston for the vacant NWA Mid-Atlantic Heavyweight Championship. The match started back and forth until Houston gained the advantage with the side headlock. Khruschev fought back with a flapjack. Khruschev climbed the turnbuckles, but Houston stopped him with a dropkick. After performing a bulldog, Houston attempted to pin Khruschev, but Khruschev placed his foot on the ropes. Houston believed he had won, and Khruschev pinned him after performing a clothesline to win the match and the title. Houston had his foot on the ropes, but this was undetected by the referee.

The second match was a Mexican Death match between Abdullah the Butcher and Manny Fernandez. Abdullah had the early advantage, attacking Fernandez's head with weapons. Fernandez fought back and attacked Abdullah with his boot and belt. Fernandez performed a Flying Burrito and a flying clothesline, but missed a splash. Abdullah attempted a turnbuckle thrust in the corner, but Fernandez avoided it, and Abdullah's shoulder hit the ringpost. Fernandez then retrieved the sombrero to win the match.

The third match was a Texas Bullrope match between Black Bart and Ron Bass. If Bass won, he would receive a match with J. J. Dillon. The match started back and forth until Bart missed a clothesline, and sent himself outside the ring. Bass had the advantage with the use of the cowbell. Bart fought back briefly until both were knocked down after a shoulder block by Bass. Bass then avoided a fist drop, and attacked Bart with the cowbell. After avoiding a corner clothesline, Bass hit Bart in the head with the cowbell from the second turnbuckle, and pinned him to win the match.

The fourth match was a Texas Bullrope match between Bass and Dillon. Immediately after the previous match, Dillon came into the ring, and attacked Bass. Bass fought back with the cowbell, but accidentally hit the referee. Bart came in, and performed a piledriver to Bass. Dillon then pinned him to win the match.

The fifth match was between The Barbarian (accompanied by Paul Jones) and Superstar Billy Graham. Before the match, Graham and The Barbarian had an arm wrestling match. As Graham was about to win, Jones attacked him with his cane, and Graham won the match by disqualification and $10,000. The wrestling match started immediately, with The Barbarian having the advantage, and attacking Graham's head. Graham avoided a diving headbutt, and applied the bear hug. As The Barbarian was about to pass out from the hold, Jones attacked Graham with the cane. Graham won the match by disqualification. After the match, The Barbarian attacked Graham until he was stopped by the referee.

The sixth match was between Buddy Landel and Terry Taylor for the NWA National Heavyweight Championship. The match went back and forth, and J. J. Dillon came down to ringside during the match. As Taylor applied the side headlock, Landel pushed him into the referee, knocking him down. Dillon came onto the apron, and attempted to attack Taylor with his shoe. Taylor sent Landel into Dillon, and placed Landel on the top turnbuckle. Taylor attempted a superplex, but Dillon tripped him. Landel fell on top of Taylor, and pinned him to win the match and the title.

The seventh match was between the Minnesota Wrecking Crew (Ole and Arn Anderson) and the team of Wahoo McDaniel and Billy Jack Haynes for the NWA National Tag Team Championship. The match began with Haynes and McDaniel having the advantage over the Minnesota Wrecking Crew. The Minnesota Wrecking Crew fought back, and targeted McDaniel's left arm. Haynes tagged in, and Haynes and McDaniel gained the advantage. As McDaniel attacked Arn in the corner, Ole tripped him, and Arn pinned McDaniel as Ole held onto his foot. The Minnesota Wrecking Crew won the match, and retained the title.

The eighth match was an "I Quit" match in a steel cage between Magnum T. A. and Tully Blanchard (accompanied by Baby Doll) for the NWA United States Heavyweight Championship. The match started back and forth. Blanchard applied the camel clutch, and Magnum T. A. performed a gorilla press drop onto the top rope. Blanchard attacked Magnum T. A. with the microphone and cage, and countered mounted punches with an inverted atomic drop. Blanchard knocked down the referee, and Baby Doll threw a wooden chair into the ring. Blanchard attempted to use a sharp part of the chair, but Magnum T. A. blocked it. Magnum T. A. used the weapon on Blanchard's forehead, and forced him to give up. Magnum T. A. won the match and the title.

The ninth match was an Atlanta Street Fight between The Midnight Express (Bobby Eaton and Dennis Condrey) (accompanied by Jim Cornette) and the team of Jimmy Valiant and Miss Atlanta Lively. The match started with Valiant and Lively having the advantage until Eaton sent Valiant outside, and double-teamed Lively with Condrey. Valiant returned to the ring, but The Midnight Express performed a double clothesline to him. Eaton attempted to jump from the top turnbuckle onto Valiant, but Lively caught him with a European uppercut. Lively then pinned Eaton to win the match.

The tenth match was a steel cage match between The Rock 'n' Roll Express (Ricky Morton and Robert Gibson) and the team of Ivan and Nikita Koloff for the NWA World Tag Team Championship. The match started back and forth. The Rock 'n' Roll Express had the advantage over Ivan after a dropkick from Gibson. The Koloffs fought back, and dominated Gibson. As Ivan attacked Gibson, Morton tagged in, undetected by Ivan. After Ivan performed a back body drop to Gibson, Morton pinned Ivan with a roll-up to win the match and the title. After the match, the Koloffs, along with Krusher Khruschev, beat down Gibson with a chain.

The main event was between Dusty Rhodes and Ric Flair for the NWA World Heavyweight Championship. Rhodes had the early advantage by performing bionic elbows. Rhodes targeted Flair's right foot and sent it into the ringpost. After throwing Flair down from the top turnbuckle, Rhodes attempted to apply the figure four leglock. Flair kicked him off, and Rhodes hurt his injured left ankle. Flair failed to apply the figure four leglock, and Rhodes sent Flair outside. Rhodes sent Flair's head into the ringpost and guard rail, and performed a diving crossbody and mounted punches. Rhodes then missed a kick with his left foot, and Flair gained the advantage. Flair targeted the left leg, and applied the figure four leglock. Flair broke the hold when Rhodes rolled onto his stomach. After exchanging attacks, Rhodes performed a clothesline, and pulled Flair into the referee, knocking him outside the ring. Rhodes applied the figure four leglock, as Ole and Arn Anderson came down to interfere. Rhodes kicked Arn out, but Ole performed a high knee to Rhodes from behind. A new referee came down to officiate, and as Flair picked up Rhodes, Rhodes pinned him with an inside cradle to win the match and the title.

Aftermath
After Starrcade, Dusty Rhodes' victory was reversed by Tommy Young. The outcome of the match was changed to Rhodes winning by disqualification due to interference from Arn Anderson, and Ric Flair remained the NWA World Heavyweight Champion. Soon after, in January 1986, Flair formed the Four Horsemen stable with Arn Anderson, Ole Anderson and Tully Blanchard, along with J. J. Dillon as their manager. Flair, along with the Four Horsemen, continued his feud with Rhodes, which lasted most of the 1980s. Rhodes won the title for the third and last time from Flair during the Great American Bash tour in 1986, but Flair regained it shortly after. The feud between Flair and Rhodes was one of Flair's biggest in his career.

Baby Doll would be dropped by Tully Blanchard as his valet, she would then become Dusty Rhodes' valet for most of 1986.  Ole Anderson would be (kayfabe) injured in a match with Dusty Rhodes and the Road Warriors which resulted in the National Tag Team titles being vacated, then repackaged as the United States Tag Team titles, and Anderson would not return to action until June 1986.  Buddy Landel would be fired and the National Heavyweight title was awarded to Dusty Rhodes, later unified in 1986 with the United States Heavyweight title.  Terry Taylor would move to the Mid-South area, later becoming the UWF and being one of the territory's biggest stars.  Krusher Khrushchev would lose the Mid-Atlantic Heavyweight title to Sam Houston in January, 1986 and in the process injure (legitimately) his knee, which forced him to miss six months, while Houston would lose the title to Black Bart, then move to the Central States area after JCP purchased the territory later in 1986.  Once again the WWF expansion hit JCP, as Ron Bass. Billy Jack Haynes, and Superstar Billy Graham moved there during 1986.

The Rock & Roll Express and Midnight Express would resume their feud that began in Mid-South Wrestling, with the teams exchanging the NWA World Tag Team Championship during 1986.  Jimmy Valiant would continue his feud with Paul Jones into 1986, Jones forming an "army" with The Barbarian, Baron Von Raschke, Teijho Khan, and Pistol Pez Whatley (turning heel and becoming "Shaska" Whatley).

Results

Notes

References

External links
Starrcade 1985 review at 411mania
Starrcade 1985 review at The Powerdriver Review

1985 in professional wrestling
Events in Atlanta
Events in Greensboro, North Carolina
Starrcade
1985 in Georgia (U.S. state)
1985 in North Carolina
Professional wrestling in Atlanta
Professional wrestling in Greensboro, North Carolina
November 1985 events in the United States